Nathan Lawson (born 23 January 1999) is an Australian rugby sevens player.

Lawson attended Newington College graduating in 2016. He was a member of the Australian men's rugby seven's squad at the Tokyo 2020 Olympics. He was a last-minute replacement for Henry Paterson who was injured. The team came third in their pool round and then lost to Fiji 19–0 in the quarterfinal. He competed for Australia at the 2022 Rugby World Cup Sevens in Cape Town.

References

External links
 

1999 births
Living people
People educated at Newington College
Male rugby sevens players
Olympic rugby sevens players of Australia
Place of birth missing (living people)
Rugby sevens players at the 2020 Summer Olympics
Rugby sevens players at the 2022 Commonwealth Games